Krtíš is a river in southern central Slovakia. It flows through Zvolen and Veľký Krtíš districts, through the towns of Modrý Kameň and Veľký Krtíš. It enters the Ipeľ river near Slovenské Ďarmoty as a right tributary.

References

Rivers of Slovakia